Edward Albert White (16 March 1844 – 3 May 1922) was an English first-class cricketer active 1867–75 who played for Kent. He was born in Yalding and died in Chiswick.

References

1844 births
1922 deaths
English cricketers
Kent cricketers
North v South cricketers
Gentlemen of the South cricketers